The ITV Lunchtime News is the afternoon news programme produced by ITN on the British television network ITV. It airs Monday to Friday from 1:30pm, covering British national and international news stories and is presented by Nina Hossain.

History
Television broadcasting hours in the United Kingdom had been tightly regulated and controlled by the British government until 1972, when the then Conservative government under Prime Minister Edward Heath decided to end all limits and restrictions on the broadcasting hours of television.

ITV had been campaigning for the end of the restrictions since the mid-1960s, and finally on 19 January 1972, the government announced the lifting of all restrictions, allowing proper daytime television to launch on both the BBC and ITV.

ITN had provided a short lunchtime news summary to start the ITV schedules on a Saturday since 1959, with an afternoon news summary on a Sunday starting in the mid-1960s, however it was the lifting of the restrictions on 16 October 1972 which helped ITN to launch a codified, more solid weekday lunchtime news programme as part of a raft of new programming which would now take up broadcasting hours which were up to 1972 restricted to schools programming and adult education.

The programme was first broadcast on 16 October 1972 as First Report, a twenty-minute bulletin presented by Robert Kee at 12:40pm. The bulletin was moved to 1:00pm on 7 September 1974 and retitled as News at One on 6 September 1976. Leonard Parkin and Peter Sissons alternated as the programme's lead presenters in the same year after Kee's departure.

On 20 July 1987, the bulletin was relaunched as News at 12:30. Jon Snow and former BBC newsreader Julia Somerville fronted alternate editions of the programme. On 7 March 1988, ITV's daytime programming was rejigged and the bulletin was moved back to its 1:00pm timeslot. News at One later relaunched on 16 October 1989 with John Suchet as its lead presenter. On 7 January 1991, the programme moved this time to 12:30pm.

On 2 March 1992, News at 12:30 was relaunched as the Lunchtime News with a dual-presenting team comprising Nicholas Owen and Carol Barnes. On 6 March 1995, ITN's news bulletins were relaunched with a cohesive identity. The Lunchtime News on air team was revamped, this time with a returning Julia Somerville alongside Dermot Murnaghan. Owen and Barnes remained as relief presenters.

On 8 March 1999, coinciding with a further relaunch of ITN's news bulletins, John Suchet returned to the newly named ITV Lunchtime News to replace Murnaghan, now lead presenter of the new ITV Nightly News. On 22 January 2001, as part of a wider reorganisation of ITV News, Suchet became the sole presenter of the Lunchtime News; in mid-2002, he was replaced by Nicholas Owen.

On 2 February 2004, ITV News was relaunched and the 12:30pm bulletin was restructured: Owen was joined by Katie Derham in a return to a dual-presenting team; then, on 11 April 2005, the programme was extended to 60 minutes. The 15-minute regional news bulletin at 3:00pm was axed and incorporated into the new 60-minute ITV Lunchtime News. On 4 September 2006, the 60-minute format was axed, returning to its shorter length and at a new broadcast time of 1:30pm. On 5 February 2007, Owen left to join BBC News and was replaced by Alastair Stewart.

In April 2007 ITN announced that ITV had awarded it a 6-year contract to produce ITV News, at a cost of £250 million.

ITV Lunchtime News switched from the traditional 4:3 format to 16:9 widescreen since 3 December 2007.

On 27 July 2009, the ITV Lunchtime News returned to a single presenter, with Stewart and Katie Derham alternating. Derham later left ITV News in June 2010 and was replaced by Nina Hossain.

On 2 November 2009, the bulletin was retitled as ITV News at 1:30 as part of a rebrand of the channel's news programmes. Since 12 October 2015, the programme was being referred to as the ITV Lunchtime News.

On 24 May 2019 it was announced Hossain would become the sole presenter of the programme.

The ITV Lunchtime News presenter also fronts the impending ITV News London lunchtime bulletin from 13:55.

On air staff

Main Newscaster
Nina Hossain (2004–present)

Relief newscasters
Geraint Vincent (2006–2012, 2021–present)
Romilly Weeks (2006–present)
Charlene White (2014–present)
Lucrezia Millarini (2017–present)
Lucy Watson (2022–present)

Former newscasters
Mark Austin (1998–2002, 2009–2010)
Carol Barnes (1980–1998)
Felicity Barr (2001–2005)
Sally Biddulph (2009)
Andrea Byrne (2010–2012)
Andrea Catherwood (2003–2006)
Katie Derham (1998–2010)
Shiulie Ghosh (2000–2004)
Andrew Harvey (2000–2001)
Alex Hyndman (2009)
Natasha Kaplinsky (2011–2013)
Robert Kee (1972–1976)
Daisy McAndrew (2006–2011)
Lucy Meacock (2007–2009)
Dermot Murnaghan (1993–1999)
Mary Nightingale (2000–2002, 2009–2015)
Nicholas Owen (1992–2007)
Leonard Parkin (1976–1987)
Sonia Ruseler (1992–1994)
Steve Scott (2005–2015)
Ranvir Singh (2014–2020)
Peter Sissons (1976–1983)
Jon Snow (1987–1988)
Julia Somerville (1987–2000)
Alastair Stewart (1983–1987, 2005–2020)
John Suchet (1989–2004)
Kirsty Young (2000–2001)

References

External links
 

1972 British television series debuts
1970s British television series
1980s British television series
1990s British television series
2000s British television series
2010s British television series
2020s British television series
ITN
ITV news shows